The 2002–03 Romanian Hockey League season was the 73rd season of the Romanian Hockey League. Four teams participated in the league, and Steaua Bucuresti won the championship.

Regular season

Final
CSA Steaua Bucuresti - SC Miercurea Ciuc (5-0, 4-1, 3:2 SO)

External links
Season on hockeyarchives.info

Romanian Hockey League seasons
Romanian 
Rom